Mogum (also known as Mogoum) is an Afro-Asiatic language spoken in south central Chad. Speakers are found in Sorki canton in Chinguil sub-prefecture.

Notes

References 

Dakouli, Padeu, Antje Maass, and David Toomey. 1996. Rapid appraisal of the Saba language of the Guera, Chad. N’Djamena: Association SIL. Manuscript.

Jungraithmayr, Herrmann. 1961. Beobachtungen zur tschadohamitischen Sprache der Jegu (und Jonkor) von Abu Telfan (République du Tchad). Afrika und Übersee 45:95–123.

Jungraithmayr, Herrmann. 1964. Die Sprache der Jegu im zentralen Sudan und ihre Stellung innerhalb der tschadohamitischen Sprachen. Wiener Zeitschrift für die Kunde des Morgenlandes 59/60:44–51.

Rendinger, Général de. 1949. Contribution à l’étude des langues nègres du Centre-africain. Journal de la Société des Africanistes. 19(2). 143–194. Online: http://www.persee.fr/web/revues/home/prescript/article/jafr_0037-9166_1949_num_19_2_2599.

East Chadic languages
Languages of Chad